Delegated authority is an authority obtained from another that has authority since the authority does not naturally exist.

Typically this is used in a government context where an organization that is created by a legitimate government, such as a Board, City, Town or other Public Corporations to allow them to legally function in the name of the constitutional government.

See also 
 Mandate (politics)

Authority